SoloQuest 3: The Snow King's Bride is a tabletop role-playing game adventure for RuneQuest. Originally published by Chaosium in 1982, it was republished in 2018 in PDF format as part of Chaosium's RuneQuest: Classic Edition Kickstarter. The republished edition, titled SoloQuest Collection contained the original adventure, plus SoloQuest and SoloQuest 2: Scorpion Hall .

Contents
SoloQuest 3: The Snow King's Bride is a solo adventure in which the player character must accompany Brunhild the Boisterous through rugged mountainous terrain to her husband-to-be in Valhalavalla.

Reception
William Peschel reviewed The Snow King's Bride in The Space Gamer No. 62. Peschel commented that "The Snow King's Bride is a worthwhile investment for those who want a solo adventure."

Oliver Dickinson reviewed SoloQuest 3: The Snow King's Bride for White Dwarf #42, giving it an overall rating of 8 out of 10, and stated that "I found this an extremely varied and enjoyable scenario, which could well provide an episode in the career of some favourite character."

Reviews
Different Worlds #40 (July/Aug., 1985)

References

External links
 

Role-playing game supplements introduced in 1982
RuneQuest adventures